Symphlebia suanus is a moth in the family Erebidae. It was described by Herbert Druce in 1902. It is found in Peru and Venezuela.

References

Moths described in 1902
Symphlebia